Imma torophracta is a moth in the family Immidae. It was described by Edward Meyrick in 1935. It is found in Hunan, China.

References

Moths described in 1935
Immidae
Moths of Asia